Count Ferenc Esterházy de Galántha (19 September 1715 – 7 November 1785) was a Hungarian noble and politician who served as Ban of Croatia between 1783 and 1785.

References

Sources
 Markó, László: A magyar állam főméltóságai Szent Istvántól napjainkig – Életrajzi Lexikon pp. 308–309. (The High Officers of the Hungarian State from Saint Stephen to the Present Days – A Biographical Encyclopedia) (2nd edition); Helikon Kiadó Kft., 2006, Budapest; .

1715 births
1785 deaths
People from Pápa
Ferenc
Hungarian politicians
Bans of Croatia
18th-century philanthropists
Knights of the Golden Fleece of Austria
Grand Crosses of the Order of Saint Stephen of Hungary